Raroth  is a village in Kozhikode district in the state of Kerala, India.

Demographics
 India census, Raroth had a population of 29583 with 14515 males and 15068 females.

References

Villages in Kozhikode district
Thamarassery area